The Consulate General of the United States in Wuhan is one of the seven American diplomatic and consular posts in the People's Republic of China.

First established in 1861, the U.S. Consulate General in Wuhan reopened in 2008 at its present location at 568 Jianshe Avenue in New World International Trade Tower I. It is the smallest consulate of the United States in China, providing emergency services to U.S. citizens in the region and promoting economic and cultural exchanges. On June 8, 2012, Gary Locke, then-U.S. ambassador to China, announced that the Consulate-General in Wuhan would be expanded to include full consular and visa services.

History of the consulate

Beginning

The first American Consulate in Wuhan was opened in April 1861, one month after Hankow became one of China's treaty ports.

The old consulate built in 1905 was previously JK Panoff's Residence, located on the corner of the Bund with Station Road in the Hankow Russian Concession. It is a red baroque-style keep in brick and concrete structure. The consulate closed in 1949, after the end of Chinese Civil War.  Now, the building has been transformed into the Wuhan Career Fair Building.

Reopening

The U.S. Consulate General Wuhan reopened in 2008 after an absence of nearly 60 years. The consulate's office is located in the New World International Trade Tower, in the Hankou District of Wuhan.

When it reopened as an American Presence Post (APP), it was staffed by one American Foreign Service Officer.

The Consulate General of the United States in Wuhan was established in November 2007 under the provisions of the 1981 U.S.-China Agreement on Consular Facilities. The Consulate General focuses on providing emergency services to American citizens in the region, promoting U.S. exports and fostering other aspects of our commercial and economic relations, and expanding cultural and educational exchanges between the U.S. and central China.

This is one of five American diplomatic and consular posts in the mainland of the People's Republic of China.  The others are:  the Embassy in Beijing, and consulate-generals in Guangzhou, Shenyang, and Shanghai.

The current Consul General is Melissa Lan.

Expanding

On February 10, 2017, U.S. Consulate-General in Wuhan broke ground on site of future office in Minsheng Bank Building. The construction was planned to start in February and to be completed in summer of 2018, by which time the consulate's capable of offering non-immigrant visa, American citizen services, and other consular services. The new consulate office will also include a large multi-purpose room which will be used to host American cultural events such as lectures, movie nights, art and music.

Consuls General

 Melissa Lan, 2021 - Present
 Jamie Fouss, 2017 – 2021
 Joseph Zadrozny, 2014 - 2017
 Vlad Lipschutz, 2012 - 2014
 Diane Sovereign, 2010 - 2012
 Wendy Lyle, 2008 - 2010

See also
 List of diplomatic missions of the United States
 U.S. Embassy Beijing
 U.S. Consulate General Chengdu
 U.S. Consulate General Guangzhou
 U.S. Consulate General Shanghai
 U.S. Consulate General Shenyang
 Americans in China

References

Diplomatic missions of the United States
Diplomatic missions in China
Buildings and structures in Wuhan
China–United States relations